Series 2043 is a diesel-electric locomotive series on Croatian Railways.

With the electrification of magistral railway lines the need has arisen that diesel locomotives are put into service on less frequently used lines. Usually lesser axle load is allowed on a branch line and less frequented lines.

A locomotive, which was light and powerful enough was needed.

Therefore, the series 2061 was stripped down and series 2043 was created.

All six locomotives were taken out of service, the last one in 2011. With this the most weight was lost. Now, the adhesion is distributed differently.

External links
 2043 at zeljeznice.net (in Croatian)

2043
Diesel-electric locomotives of Yugoslavia